George Theo Teague (born February 18, 1971) is a former American football safety in the National Football League (NFL) who played for the Green Bay Packers, Dallas Cowboys and Miami Dolphins. He played college football at the University of Alabama.

Early years
An Air Force brat, Teague grew up at McConnell Air Force Base, Kansas attending Derby High School in Derby, Kansas and Sembach Air Base, before moving to Alabama and attending Jefferson Davis High School. As a senior cornerback, he was named first-team class 6A All-state and Academic All-state. He also practiced track.

He accepted a football scholarship from the University of Alabama. He was a reserve cornerback as a true freshman. He was named a starter at cornerback as a sophomore, tallying one interception.

As a junior, he was moved to free safety, where he led the conference with 6 interceptions and recorded career-highs for tackles (54) and passes defensed (11).

As a senior, he tied for the conference's lead with 6 interceptions. His 14 career interceptions were two short of the school record at the time. Teague came to be known nationally as a playmaker in the 1993 Sugar Bowl. This game marked his first interception returned for a touchdown in his college career. Five plays later, he raced downfield and caught up with sprinting wide receiver Lamar Thomas and stripped the ball from him in full stride, while maintaining possession and returning the ball upfield. Although the play was called back on an offsides penalty against Alabama, it was still successful in preventing a Hurricane touchdown, as Miami would have simply declined the penalty had the strip not taken place. It also negated Miami's effort to regain their offensive momentum: Miami was forced to punt soon afterward, and never mounted another substantial offensive threat in the Crimson Tide's 34–13 victory.

Professional career

Green Bay Packers
Teague was selected by the Green Bay Packers in the first round (29th overall) of the 1993 NFL Draft. He started the last 12 games at free safety, making 36 tackles, 6 passes defensed, one forced fumble, one interception, 2 fumble recoveries and 5 special teams tackles. In the playoffs against the Detroit Lions, he recorded the longest interception return for a touchdown in post-season history (101 yards), and along with his 4 tackles, earned him the NFL's Defensive Player of the Week award.

In 1994, he practiced on a limited basis early in training camp due to thyroid condition, which caused a pronounced weight loss initially and later affected his conditioning. He began practicing on a full-time basis until August 4. He started 16 games, collecting 53 tackles, 3 interceptions (tied for second on the team), 13 passes defensed (third on the team) and one forced fumble.

In 1995, he started 15 games, making 72 tackles (tied for sixth on the team), 2 interceptions, 13 passes defensed and one fumble recovery. He missed one game with a broken toe.

Atlanta Falcons
On August 17, 1996, the Atlanta Falcons waived Teague after only a month.

Dallas Cowboys (first stint)
On August 23, 1996, Teague was signed as a free agent by the Dallas Cowboys. He played as a nickel defensive back, before starting 8 games after Brock Marion suffered a broken shoulder blade. He finished the year with 70 tackles, 7 passes defensed, 6 special teams tackles and a career-high 4 interceptions.

His career signature game came against the Minnesota Vikings in the NFC wild-card playoff game, where he was dominant in helping the Cowboys produce a 40–15 rout. He forced turnovers on three consecutive Vikings possessions. He first denied Amp Lee of a 43-yard touchdown reception, by stripping the ball which went out of the end zone for a touchback. On the next Vikings possession he caused a Leroy Hoard fumble. He then proceeded to return an interception 29 yards for a touchdown. He received NFL Defensive Player of the Week honors.

The Cowboys couldn't re-sign him at the end of the season, because of the salary cap problems they had at the time.

Miami Dolphins
On March 19, 1997, he was signed away by the Miami Dolphins as a free agent after jump-starting his career with the Cowboys. He began the season as a backup to Corey Harris. He was named the starter at free safety in the seventh game and remained there until the twelfth contest, after Calvin Jackson was moved from cornerback to safety to make room for rookie Sam Madison. He started 6 games, tallying 43 tackles, 3 passes defensed, 2 forced fumbles and 3 special teams tackles. On March 10, 1998, the Dolphins ended up waiving him at the end of the year to make room for safety Brock Marion.

Dallas Cowboys (second stint)
On May 6, 1998, he was signed by the Dallas Cowboys as a free agent, to replace Brock Marion, who in turn had signed with the Dolphins to replace Teague. He played as a nickel defensive back, before passing Omar Stoutmire on the depth chart and being named the starter at free safety in the tenth game against the Arizona Cardinals. He registered 52 tackles (tenth on the team), 2 sacks, 6 passes defensed and 9 special teams tackles.

In 1999, he started 14 games at free safety, making 102 tackles (fourth on the team), 2 tackles for loss, 9 passes defensed, one forced fumble, one fumble recovery, 8 special teams tackles and 3 interceptions, including two returned for touchdowns. He missed 2 games with a strained neck injury.

In 2000, he started 9 games, missing the final 7 contests with a fractured right foot. He recorded 71 tackles and was on a pace to register a career-high 127 stops before he suffered his injury. He also had 5 special teams tackles. Teague is best remembered for a notable incident during a game against the San Francisco 49ers on September 24. In that game, 49ers wide receiver Terrell Owens caught his second touchdown pass of the game and ran to the Cowboys' star logo at midfield to celebrate as he had on his previous touchdown. Teague violently shoved Owens from behind during the celebration and was ejected from the game. In 2008, the moment was named one of the ten most memorable in the history of Texas Stadium by ESPN.

In 2001, he started 16 games. On September 23, just two weeks after the September 11 attacks, as the Cowboys were taking the field to play the San Diego Chargers at Texas Stadium, Teague carried the American flag, displayed above his head. He was released in a salary cap move on February 28, 2002.

NFL statistics

Coaching career
On December 9, 2016, he accepted a position as the head football coach at John Paul II High School in Plano, Texas. He previously served as the Athletic Director and football coach for June Shelton School, Harvest Christian Academy and Carrollton Christian Academy.

References

1971 births
Living people
Players of American football from Montgomery, Alabama
American football safeties
Alabama Crimson Tide football players
Green Bay Packers players
Miami Dolphins players
Dallas Cowboys players
High school football coaches in Texas
Ed Block Courage Award recipients